Summit is an unincorporated community in Hendricks County, Indiana, in the United States.

Summit was named for its lofty elevation.

References

Unincorporated communities in Hendricks County, Indiana
Unincorporated communities in Indiana